The National Defence College, located in Colombo, is the defence service training institute and highest seat of strategic learning for officers of the Sri Lankan Armed Forces, Sri Lanka Police and the Public Services. This is a very prestigious course attended only by 30 officers of One-Star rank and public servants of the senior grade of class 1. This college provides strategic leadership to the Government of Sri Lanka in national and international security matters and also acts as a think tank.

History
After Ceylon gained its independence in 1948 and the regular forces were formed, senior officers of the Ceylon Army, Royal Ceylon Navy and the Royal Ceylon Air Force attended the Imperial Defence College (IDC) in the United Kingdom as the armed forces expanded, senior officers attended the Royal College of Defence Studies, National Defence College, India, National Defence University, Islamabad, National Defence College, Bangladesh and the PLA National Defense University. With the limited number scholarships available to these institutes, the Ministry of Defense announced that national defence college will be established in Colombo in 2020.

Location
In 2020, it was proposed to establish the new NDC at Visumpaya, the former state guest house. It was eventually established at the former residence of the Speaker, Mumtaz Mahal in Colombo.

Course
The National Defence and Strategic Study Course will span for 11 months consisting of 2 semesters, covering nine subjects and include local and overseas visits. On completion of the course, the participants can use the post nominal letters  ndc  and be awarded a MSc degree from the General Sir John Kotelawala Defence University. Further study could lead to a MPhil degree from the General Sir John Kotelawala Defence University.

See also
 Ministry of Defence (Sri Lanka)
 Military academies in Sri Lanka
 Defence Services Command and Staff College

References

Military academies of Sri Lanka
Staff colleges
Universities and colleges in Colombo
Colleges affiliated to General Sir John Kotelawala Defence University
Educational institutions established in 2021
2021 establishments in Sri Lanka
Graduate schools in Sri Lanka